Wyoming was an American wooden six-masted schooner built and completed in 1909 by the firm of Percy & Small in Bath, Maine.

Because of her extreme length and wood construction, Wyoming tended to flex in heavy seas, which would cause the long planks to twist and buckle, thereby allowing sea water to intrude into the hold. Wyoming had to use pumps to keep her hold relatively free of water. In March 1924, she foundered in heavy seas and sank with the loss of all hands.

Description
Wyoming was designed by Bant Hanson with Miles M. Merry, the master builder for the Atlantic coastal trade, under the Percy and Small house flag with intended cargo being coal.

She had a deadweight tonnage (DWT) of 6,004 long tons, that is, the weight of the ship fully loaded, including the crew, cargo (6,000 tons), fuel, water and stores, less the weight of the ship when totally empty (4,000 tons). It could carry 6,000 long tons of coal. Wyoming was built of yellow pine with 6" planking and there were 90 diagonal iron cross-bracings on each side.

Wyoming was equipped with a Hyde anchor windlass and a donkey steam engine to raise and lower sails, haul lines and perform other tasks. The steam engine was not used to power the ship, but permitted it to be sailed with a smaller crew of only 11 hands. She was named for the state of Wyoming because Wyoming Governor Bryant Butler Brooks (1907–1921) was one of the investors in the ship, which cost $175,000 in 1909 dollars.  Another Percy & Small-built schooner, the five-masted Governor Brooks, was named after Brooks.

History

1909 – 15 December. Launched at the Percy and Small Shipyard with its masts stepped. First master: Captain Angus McLeod of Somerville, Massachusetts.
1909 – 21 December. Maiden voyage to Newport News, Virginia
1916 – In charter of International Paper Company
1917 – April. Sold to France & Canada Steamship Co. for about $350,000 (probably about $420,000). By 1 October 1919, it had earned more than twice that amount, and its owners chartered it to load coal at Norfolk for Genoa at $23.50 per ton.
1921 – Sold to Captain A. W. Frost & Co., Portland, Maine.
1924 – Left Norfolk, Virginia, under command of Captain Charles Glaesel, for Saint John, New Brunswick, with a cargo of coal.
1924 – 11 March. In order to ride out a nor'easter, it anchored off Chatham, Massachusetts, in the Nantucket Sound, together with the five-masted schooner Cora F. Cressey which had left Norfolk at the same time as Wyoming. Captain H. Publicover on the Cora F. Cressey weighed anchor at dusk and stood out to sea. Wyoming is believed to have foundered east of the Pollock Rip Lightship and the crew of 14 was lost.
2003 - Wyoming wreck located near Monomoy Island by American Underwater Search and Survey Ltd.

References

External links

My Favorite Exhibit by Bill Gruener, Maine Maritime Museum
Midship Section of the Wyoming

1909 ships
1909 establishments in Maine
Individual sailing vessels
Maritime incidents in 1924
Schooners of the United States
Ships built in Bath, Maine
Ships lost with all hands
Shipwrecks of the Massachusetts coast
Six-masted ships
Tall ships of the United States
World War I merchant ships of the United States
Lost sailing vessels
1924 disestablishments in Massachusetts
Chatham, Massachusetts
History of Barnstable County, Massachusetts